Simony Benelli Galasso (born July 1, 1976) is a Brazilian singer and television presenter. She is most well known for being a member of child pop band Turma do Balão Mágico, which sold more than 10 million records. Since leaving Turma do Balão Mágico, Simony has been a television presenter.

Discography

Albums
with Turma do Balão Mágico
 A Turma do Balão Mágico (1982 album)
 A Turma do Balão Mágico (1983 album)
 A Turma do Balão Mágico (1984 album)
 A Turma do Balão Mágico (1985 album)
 A Turma do Balão Mágico (1987 album)

with Jairzinho
 Jairzinho & Simony (1987)
 Jairzinho & Simony (in Spanish) (1988)

Solo albums
 Sonhando Acordada (1989)
 Simonny (1995)
 Certas Coisas (1996)
 Simplesmente Eu (2001)
 Celebração (2005)
 Superfantástica (2008)
 Ela Cansou de Ser Forte (2020)

Singles 
1987 - "Coração de Papelão"
1987 - "Meu Bem"
1989 - "Acho que Sou Louca"
1995 - "Primeiros Erros"
1995 - "Pelo Menos Uma Vez"
1996 - "Quando Te Vi"
2001 - "Caixa Postal"
2001 - "Ficar por Ficar"
2004 - "Impossível Acreditar que Perdi Você"
2005 - "Resumo da Felicidade"
2006 - "Começo, Meio e Fim"
2008 - "Superfantástico"
2009 - "Ursinho Pimpão"
2010 - "Em Todo Caminhar" (with Maurílio Santos)
2010 - "Dependente do Seu Amor" (with Grupo Tapa no Couro)
2011 - "Segunda Chance" (with Brandy and Rony)
2011 - "Não Vai Dar" (with Grupo Desejos)
2012 - "Quando Chove" (with Grupo Sem Querer)
2012 - "Sonhos Pra Quem Quiser"

Soundtracks for novelas
1995: "Primeiros Erros" — Cara e Coroa
1996: "Quando Te Vi" — Salsa e Merengue
2004: "Impossível Acreditar que Perdi Você" — A Escrava Isaura
2006: "Começo, Meio e Fim" — Prova de Amor
2012: "Sonhos Para Quem Quiser" — Carrossel

Filmography

Television

References

1976 births
Living people
Singers from São Paulo
Brazilian women television presenters
Brazilian people of Italian descent
Brazilian mezzo-sopranos
Participants in Brazilian reality television series
Música Popular Brasileira singers
Brazilian child singers
21st-century Brazilian singers